The 1927 South Carolina Gamecocks football team was an American football team that represented the University of South Carolina as a member of the Southern Conference (SoCon) during the 1927 college football season. Led by Harry Lightsey in his first and only season as head coach, the Gamecocks compiled an overall record of 4–5 with a mark of 2–4 in conference play, tying for 16th place in the SoCon.

Schedule

References

South Carolina
South Carolina Gamecocks football seasons
South Carolina Gamecocks football